Blanche Stuart Scott (April 8, 1884 – January 12, 1970), also known as Betty Scott, was possibly the first American woman aviator.

Biography

Early life
Blanche Stuart Scott was born on April 8, 1884, in Rochester, New York, to Belle and John Scott. Her father was a successful businessman who manufactured and sold patent medicine. Scott became an early enthusiast of the automobile. Her father bought a car and she drove it about the city in a time before there were minimum age restrictions on driving. In 1900 the family, still in Rochester, lived at 116 Weld Avenue. Scott's family considered her a tomboy and sent her to a finishing school.

Automobile adventure

In 1910 Scott became the second woman, after Alice Huyler Ramsey, to drive an automobile across the United States and the first driving westwards from New York City to San Francisco, California. The trip was sponsored by the Willys-Overland Company and the car was named the "Lady Overland". Scott and her passenger, a woman reporter called Gertrude Buffington Phillips, left New York on May 16, 1910, and reached San Francisco on July 23, 1910. The New York Times wrote on May 17, 1910:
Miss Scott, with Miss Phillips as only companion, starts on long trip with the object of demonstrating the possibility of a woman driving a motor car across the country and making all the necessary repairs en route. Miss Blanche Stuart Scott yesterday started in an Overland automobile on a transcontinental journey which will end in San Francisco.

Achievements in aviation

The publicity surrounding the automobile journey brought her to the attention of Jerome Fanciulli and Glenn Curtiss who agreed to provide her with flying lessons in Hammondsport, New York. She was the only woman to receive instruction directly from Curtiss. He fitted a limiter on the throttle of Scott's airplane to prevent it gaining enough speed to become airborne while she practiced taxiing on her own. On September 6 either the limiter moved or a gust of wind lifted the biplane and she flew to an altitude of forty feet before executing a gentle landing. Her flight was short and possibly unintentional but Scott is credited by the Early Birds of Aviation as the first woman to pilot and solo in an airplane in the United States, although Bessica Medlar Raiche's flight on September 16 was accredited as first by the Aeronautical Society of America at the time.

Scott subsequently became a professional pilot. On October 24, 1910, she made her debut as a member of the Curtiss exhibition team at an air meet in Fort Wayne, Indiana. She was the first woman to fly at a public event in America. Her exhibition flying earned her the nickname "Tomboy of the Air". She became an accomplished stunt pilot known for flying upside down and performing "death dives", diving from an altitude of 4000 feet and suddenly pulling up only 200 feet from the ground. In 1911 she became the first woman in America to fly long distance when she flew 60 miles non-stop from Mineola, New York. In 1912 Scott contracted to fly for Glenn Martin and became the first female test pilot when she flew Martin prototypes before the final blueprints for the aircraft had been made. In 1913 she joined the Ward exhibition team.

Scriptwriting and museum work
In the 1930s Scott worked as a scriptwriter for RKO, Universal Studios and Warner Brothers in California. She also wrote, produced and performed on radio shows aired in California and Rochester. On September 6, 1948, Scott became the first American woman to fly in a jet when she was the passenger in a TF-80C piloted by Chuck Yeager. Knowing Scott's history as a stunt pilot, Yeager treated her to some snap rolls and a 14,000 foot dive. In 1954 Scott began working for what was originally known as the United States Air Force Museum, helping to acquire early aviation materials.

Death and afterward
Scott died on Monday, January 12, 1970, at Genesee Hospital in Rochester, New York, at age 84. She was cremated at Mount Hope Cemetery. Her grave is at Rochester's Riverside Cemetery.

On December 30, 1980, the United States Postal Service issued an air mail stamp commemorating Scott's achievements in aviation. In 2005, Scott was inducted into the National Women's Hall of Fame.

References

Further reading
Trenton Evening Times; Trenton, New Jersey, May 28, 1910; 
The New York Times; May 17, 1910, page 11, Woman to drive auto to Frisco: Miss Scott, with Miss Phillips as Only Companion, Starts on Long Trip. With the object of demonstrating the possibility of a woman driving a motor car across the country and making all the necessary repairs en route. Miss Blanche Stuart Scott yesterday started in an Overland automobile on a transcontinental Journey which will end in San Francisco.
The New York Times; February 27, 1960, page 21, Woman Who Began Flying in 1910 Recalls the Day
The New York Times; January 13, 1970, page 45, Blanche Stuart Scott, 84, Dies; Made First Solo Flight in 1910; Feat Followed Cross-Country Drive Later Toured as Daredevil Flier

External links

 Hargrave: Blanche Scott 
 Early Aviators: Blanche Scott
 U.S. National Postal Museum: Blanche Scott air mail stamp

1880s births
1970 deaths
American women aviators
Aviators from New York (state)
Aviation pioneers
Members of the Early Birds of Aviation